Staindrop Academy (formerly Staindrop School) is a coeducational secondary school located in Staindrop, County Durham, England.

Previously a community school administered by Durham County Council, Staindrop School converted to academy status in August 2011, and was later renamed Staindrop Academy. However the school continues to coordinate with Durham County Council for admissions.

Staindrop Academy offers GCSEs and BTECs as programmes of study for pupils.

Notable former pupils
Tony McMahon, footballer

References

External links
Staindrop Academy official website

Secondary schools in County Durham
Academies in County Durham
Staindrop